Consolidated Communications of Vermont Company, LLC is a telephone operating company owned by Consolidated Communications of Northern New England, a subsidiary of Consolidated Communications.

The company was created following Verizon's 2008 sale of its telephone lines in Maine, New Hampshire, and Vermont to FairPoint Communications. All of Verizon's assets in those states were grouped into a new holding company to be sold off and merged into FairPoint, Northern New England Spinco. All three states had been served by Verizon New England, formerly New England Telephone, a Bell Operating Company. FairPoint was subsequently acquired by Consolidated Communications. 

The company was named Telephone Operating Company of Vermont LLC until March 19, 2019.
 
The company is not connected to FairPoint Vermont, an operating company consisting of former GTE lines that FairPoint owned since before acquiring the Verizon assets.

See also

 Verizon New England
 NYNEX
 Consolidated Communications of Northern New England

References

Verizon Communications
FairPoint Communications
Bell System
American companies established in 2008
Communications in Vermont
Technology companies established in 2008
Companies based in Vermont
2008 establishments in Vermont
Telecommunications companies established in 2008